"United Breaks Guitars" is a trio of protest songs by Canadian musician Dave Carroll and his band, Sons of Maxwell. It chronicles a real-life experience of how his guitar was broken during a trip on United Airlines in 2008, and the reaction from the airline. The song became an immediate YouTube and iTunes hit upon its release in July 2009 and a public-relations embarrassment for the airline.

Incident 
Musician Dave Carroll said his guitar was broken while in United Airlines' custody. He said that he heard a fellow passenger exclaim that baggage handlers on the ramp at Chicago O'Hare International Airport were throwing guitars during a layover on his flight from Halifax Stanfield International Airport to Omaha, Nebraska's Eppley Airfield. He arrived at his destination to discover that his $3,500 Taylor guitar was severely damaged. Fox News questioned Carroll on why he checked the valuable guitar and Carroll explained that it is difficult to bring guitars onto flights as carry-on luggage. In his song, he sang that he "alerted three employees who showed complete indifference towards me" when he raised the matter in Chicago. Carroll filed a claim with United Airlines which informed him that he was ineligible for compensation because he had failed to make the claim within its stipulated "standard 24-hour timeframe".

Song 
Carroll says that his fruitless negotiations with the airline lasted about nine months. Then, asking himself, "if Michael Moore was a singer-songwriter, what would he do?", Carroll wrote a song and created a music video about his experience. The song's refrain includes "I should have flown with someone else, or gone by car, 'cause United breaks guitars." Carroll, who has performed as a solo artist and as a member of the group Sons of Maxwell, wrote two sequel songs related to the events. The second video, "United Breaks Guitars: Song 2" was released on YouTube on August 17, 2009. The song takes a humorous look at Carroll's dealings with "the unflappable" United customer service employee Ms. Irlweg, and targets the "flawed policies" that she was forced to uphold. In March 2010, "United Breaks Guitars: Song 3" was released. The song notes that not all employees at United are "bad apples."  The final line of the trilogy of songs is, "You say that you're changing and I hope you do, 'Cause if you don't then who would fly with you?"

Response
The YouTube video was posted on July 6, 2009. It amassed 150,000 views within one day, prompting United to contact Carroll saying it hoped to right the wrong. The video had over half a million views by July 9, 5 million by mid-August 2009, 10 million by February 2011, and 15 million by August 2015. It has roughly 22 million views and 287,000 likes as of December 2022.

Media reported the story of the song's instant success and the public relations humiliation for United Airlines. Attempting to put a positive gloss on the incident and the song, a company spokesman called it "excellent". Rob Bradford, United's managing director of customer solutions, telephoned Carroll to apologize for the incident and to ask for permission to use the video for internal training. United claimed that it "hoped" to learn from the incident, and to change its customer service policy accordingly.

Bob Taylor, owner of Taylor Guitars, immediately offered Carroll two guitars and other props for his second video. The song hit number one on the iTunes Music Store the week following its release. The belated compensation offer of $3,000, which was donated by United to the Thelonious Monk Institute of Jazz as a "gesture of goodwill," failed to undo the damage done to its image (it was later revealed that the Thelonious Monk Institute of Jazz was, at the time, chaired largely by United executives and used United Airlines exclusively for its corporate travel). In response to his protest's success, Carroll posted a video address thanking the public for their support while urging a more understanding and civil attitude towards Ms. Irlweg, who was just doing her job in accordance with mandated company policies in this affair.

Since the incident, Carroll has been in great demand as a speaker on customer service.  Coincidentally, on one of his trips as a speaker, United Airlines lost his luggage.

In December 2009, Time magazine named "United Breaks Guitars" No. 7 on its list of the Top 10 Viral Videos of 2009.

In January 2012, Carroll and "United Breaks Guitars" were featured in the CBC/CNBC documentary Customer (Dis)Service.

In May 2012, Carroll published a book, United Breaks Guitars: The Power of One Voice in the Age of Social Media, detailing his experiences.

In January 2013, the success of Carroll's online protest was used by the German television and news service Tagesschau to exemplify a new kind of threat facing corporations in the internet age.

In June 2013, NBC's Today Show discussed "how to properly complain and get what you want" and used a Carroll video as an example of a good way to complain while remaining "respectful" and "not yelling".

On April 9, 2017, #unitedbreaksguitars trended on Twitter. This was following the release of a video that showed United Airlines physically forcing a passenger, Dr. David Dao, off Flight 3411 in order to make room for crew members who were needed at a different airport the following day, injuring him in the process. On an interview with As It Happens two days later, in light of the incident, Carroll described that the same problem has emerged and thought it has to do with the culture in United Airlines which showed a lack of compassion.

Stock price effect 
It was widely reported that within four weeks of the video being posted online, United Airlines' stock price fell 10%, costing stockholders about $180 million in value.

In fact, UAL opened at $3.31 on July 6, 2009, and dipped to an intra-day low $3.07 (-7.25%) on July 10, but that very day closed at $3.26 and traded as high as $6.00 (+81.27%) four weeks later on August 6.

See also
Tom Paxton had a similar experience which he recounted in the song "Thank You Republic Airlines" on his 1985 album One Million Lawyers and Other Disasters.
Bing Futch also had a similar experience when Northwest Airlines damaged his unique double mountain dulcimer. In response he wrote and recorded "Only a Northwest Song". However, unlike United Airlines' obstinate refusal to take responsibility when they destroyed Dave Carroll's guitar, Northwest Airlines apologized to Bing Futch and offered him compensation within a day of when the video was posted.
In the United Express Flight 3411 incident, a man was dragged off the plane in 2017 to free up seats for deadheading employees, and video of the incident went viral online, another public relations disaster for the airline.

References

External links

United Breaks Guitars, Dave Carroll's Blog of the incident (July 7, 2009). Retrieved July 8, 2009.

2009 songs
Dave Carroll songs
Internet memes
Protest songs
Songs about guitars
United Airlines
United Airlines accidents and incidents